Claude Legault (born May 26, 1963) is a Canadian actor and television writer from Quebec.

Biography
Legault was a star (2000-2003) of the Ligue Nationale d'Improvisation and has since appeared regularly on television, stage and film. He was part of the cast of the T.V. series 450 chemin du Golf and Annie et ses Hommes and of Le retour. He also plays in Minuit, le soir and Dans une galaxie près de chez vous, two series that he developed and wrote with his old partner in crime Pierre-Yves Bernard. Together, they also wrote the movie Dans une galaxie près de chez vous, in which he portrays Flavien Bouchard. Moreover, Legault was co author of Le monde selon Dieu, in which he played at Espace GO and at the Vieux-Clocher in Sherbrooke, Quebec. He has been seen on stage in Durocher le milliardaire and Propagande and on the big screen in Gaz Bar Blues, Les 7 Jours du Talion and 10½. He also starred in the series 19-2.

He received a Genie Award nomination for Best Actor at the 28th Genie Awards for The 3 L'il Pigs (Les 3 p'tits cochons), and won the Prix Iris for Best Supporting Actor at the 24th Quebec Cinema Awards in 2022 for Drunken Birds (Les Oiseaux ivres).

Filmography

Television

Films

Awards 

  [10 ½] :
 [ Jutra Award | Jutra Award for Best Actor ]
  [The 100 Watts Club] :
 [Gemini Prize for best text for a children's program or series]
  19-2 :
 [Artis Prize | Artis Prize for Best Leading Male Role: TV series]
  [Annie and her men] :
 [Gémeaux Award for best male supporting role # Teleroman | Gémeaux Award for best male supporting role: soap opera] 2006
  [Midnight, evening] :
 Gemini Award for Best Leading Male Role: Dramatic 2005
 Gemini Award for Best Text for a Dramatic Series 2006
 Gemini Award for Best Leading Male Role: Dramatic 2006
 Gemini Award for Best Text for a Dramatic Series 2007
 Artis Award for Best Male Role: 2007 TV series
 Artis Prize for Best Male Role: 2008 television series
 [1998] - [2001]:  [In a galaxy near you] : Flavien Bouchard (co-author)
 [Gemini Prize for best text for a children's program or series] 2000
 [Gemini Prize for best text for a children's program or series] 2001

References

External links
 
 TV series profile (actor)

Living people
1963 births
Canadian male stage actors
Canadian male film actors
Place of birth missing (living people)
Canadian male television actors
Canadian screenwriters in French
Male actors from Quebec
French Quebecers
Writers from Quebec
Best Actor Jutra and Iris Award winners
Best Supporting Actor Jutra and Iris Award winners